Adalberto Figarolo di Gropello, Count of Gropello (born 24 February 1910, date of death unknown) was an Italian diplomat.

Biography
Born in Barza d'Ispra (Varese) on 24 February 1910, Adalberto Figarolo di Gropello earned a degree in Law at the University of Florence in 1933.

Di Gropello was the 7th Italian Ambassador to Pakistan. He became Italian Ambassador to Norway in 1964, a office which he held until 1967. He later became Italian Ambassador to Algeria (1967 – 1971).

See also 
 Ministry of Foreign Affairs (Italy)
 Foreign relations of Italy

References

1910 births
Year of death missing
Ambassadors of Italy to Pakistan
Ambassadors of Italy to Norway
Ambassadors of Italy to Algeria
Italian diplomats
Counts of Italy
20th-century diplomats